Helado may refer to:

 Helado, the Spanish word for ice cream
 Helados EFE, C.A., an ice cream company that is a subsidiary of Empresas Polar